Ramanna Rai Gadigudde (28 September 1930 – 6 October 2009) was an Indian Politician, Social Activist and a Member of Parliament who represented the Kasaragod constituency of Kerala thrice in the 7th Lok Sabha, 9th Lok Sabha and 10th Lok Sabha respectively. He was a member of the Communist Party of India (Marxist).

Early life
Rai was born in an affluent Tulu speaking Bunt family of landlords. He completed his education at Government college, Madras University and Karnataka University earning the degrees of B.A. and L.L.B.

Political career
Rai's public life started with his active participation in the movement against the merger of Kasaragod with Kerala in 1956. Later he joined the Communist Party of India (CPI) and served as the secretary of the Kasaragod local committee of undivided Communist Party from 1960 to 1964. After a division in the Communist party, he identified himself with CPM and served as member of the Kannur district committee of CPM from 1965 to 1986. He served as the president of Kasargod Municipal Council from 1968 to 1979 and got elected to the Lok Sabha from Kasaragod constituency thrice in the year 1980, 1989 and 1991.

Later life
Rai died on 6 October 2009. He had withdrawn himself from public life due to ill health. An atheist by conviction, his body was donated to the Pariyaram Medical College as per his wishes instead of being cremated according to the traditional Hindu rites of the Bunt community to which he belonged.

References

Communist Party of India (Marxist) politicians from Kerala
2009 deaths
1930 births
India MPs 1991–1996
India MPs 1989–1991
People from Kasaragod district
India MPs 1980–1984
Indian atheists
Lok Sabha members from Kerala